Roade Cutting is a  geological Site of Special Scientific Interest along the West Coast Main Line north from Roade in Northamptonshire. It is a Geological Conservation Review site.

The cutting exposes rocks dating to the Middle Jurassic Bathonian stage, between 168.3 and 167.1 million years ago. It is described by Natural England as important for reconstructing the environment of deposition during the period, and correlating the White Limestone Formation in Oxfordshire and the East Midlands.

The site can be viewed from road and foot bridges.

References

Sites of Special Scientific Interest in Northamptonshire
Geological Conservation Review sites